Madagascarentomon is a genus of proturans in the family Eosentomidae.

Species
 Madagascarentomon condei Nosek, 1978

References

Protura
Arthropods of Madagascar